The Drybones Bay kimberlite pipe is a diamondiferous diatreme in the Slave craton of the Northwest Territories, Canada. It is the largest diatreme discovered in the Northwest Territories.

See also
Volcanology of Canada
Volcanology of Northern Canada

References

Diatremes of the Northwest Territories
Pre-Holocene volcanoes